Events from the year 1976 in the United States. Major events include Jimmy Carter defeating incumbent president Gerald Ford in the presidential election of that year, the incorporation of Apple Computer Company and Microsoft, and the New Jersey Supreme Court ruling that Karen Ann Quinlan could be disconnected from her ventilator.

Incumbents

Federal Government 
 President: Gerald Ford (R-Michigan)
 Vice President: Nelson Rockefeller (R-New York)
 Chief Justice: Warren E. Burger (Minnesota)
 Speaker of the House of Representatives: Carl Albert (D-Oklahoma)
 Senate Majority Leader: Mike Mansfield (D-Montana)
 Congress: 94th

Events

January
 January 5 – The Beatles associate Mal Evans is fatally shot by police amid a disturbance at his Los Angeles home.
 January 14 – The Lutz family flees from 112 Ocean Avenue in Amityville, Long Island, New York, 28 days after having moved in on December 18, 1975, inspiring the story The Amityville Horror.
 January 15 – Would-be Gerald Ford presidential assassin Sara Jane Moore is sentenced to life in prison.
 January 18 – Super Bowl X in American football: The Pittsburgh Steelers defeat the Dallas Cowboys 21–17 at the Orange Bowl in Miami, Florida.
 January 19 – Jimmy Carter wins the Iowa Democratic Caucus.
 January 23 – Hugo the Hippo, the first animated film of 20th Century Fox is released in theaters.
 January 27 – The United States vetoes a United Nations resolution that calls for an independent Palestinian state.
 January 30 –  Live from Lincoln Center debuts on PBS.

February
 February 5 – Nearly 2,000 students become involved in a racially charged riot at Escambia High School in Pensacola, Florida; 30 students are injured in the 4-hour fray.
 February 11 – Clifford Alexander, Jr. is confirmed as the first African-American Secretary of the United States Army.
 February 12 – Actor Sal Mineo, known for his role in the film Rebel Without a Cause, is fatally stabbed in the alley behind his apartment building in West Hollywood, California, aged 37.
 February 17 – The Eagles' Their Greatest Hits (1971–1975) compilation is released. Globally, it will become probably the second best-selling album of all time, followed by the same band's Hotel California, released on December 8.
 February 19 – Former Tower of Power vocalist Rick Stevens is arrested for murdering three men during a botched drug deal. He ultimately serves 36 years of a life sentence.

March
 March – The Cray-1, the first commercially developed supercomputer, is released by Seymour Cray's Cray Research, with the first purchaser being the Energy Research and Development Administration (ERDA) in Los Alamos, New Mexico.
 March 1 – Bradford Bishop allegedly murders five of his family members in Bethesda, Maryland. The crime goes undiscovered for 10 days and the suspect is never caught. From 2014 to 2018 he is on the FBI Ten Most Wanted Fugitives list.
 March 9–11 – Two coal mine explosions claim 26 lives at the Blue Diamond Coal Co. Scotia Mine in Letcher County, Kentucky.
 March 14 – After eight years on NBC, The Wizard of Oz returns to CBS, where it will remain until 1999, setting what is likely a record at that time for the most telecasts of a Hollywood film on a commercial television network. (That record is broken by The Ten Commandments in 1996, which began its annual network telecasts on ABC in 1973, continuing be telecast by that network as of 2020.)
 March 17 – Boxer Rubin Carter is retried in New Jersey for murder; his conviction is upheld on this occasion but will be overturned in 1985.
 March 20 – Patty Hearst is found guilty of the armed robbery of a San Francisco bank in 1974.
 March 27 – The first 4.6 miles of the Washington Metro subway system opens.
 March 29 – The 48th Academy Awards ceremony, hosted by Walter Matthau, Robert Shaw, George Segal, Goldie Hawn and Gene Kelly, is held at Dorothy Chandler Pavilion in Los Angeles, broadcast on ABC for the first time. Miloš Forman's One Flew Over the Cuckoo's Nest receives nine nominations and wins five awards, including Best Picture and Best Director for Forman. Isabelle Adjani becomes the youngest actress to be nominated for Best Actress until 2004, while George Burns becomes the oldest actor to win Best Supporting Actor until 2012, as well as the oldest awardee in general until 1989 and the final person born in the 19th century to win an acting award.
 March 31 – The New Jersey Supreme Court rules that persistent vegetative state patient Karen Ann Quinlan can be disconnected from her ventilator. She remains comatose and dies in 1985.

April

 April 1 
Conrail (Consolidated Rails Corporation) is formed by the U.S. government, to take control of 13 major Northeast Class-1 railroads that have filed for bankruptcy protection. Conrail takes control at midnight, as a government-owned and operated railroad until 1986, when it is sold to the public.
Apple Computer Company is formed by Steve Jobs and Steve Wozniak in California.
 April 13 – The United States Treasury Department reintroduces the two-dollar bill as a Federal Reserve Note on Thomas Jefferson's 233rd birthday as part of the United States Bicentennial celebration.

May
 May 11
 U.S. President Gerald Ford signs the Federal Election Campaign Act.
 An accident involving a tanker truck carrying anhydrous ammonia takes place in Houston, Texas, resulting in the deaths of 7 people.
 May 21
 The Yuba City bus disaster, the second-worst bus crash in U.S. history, leaves 28 students and one teacher dead.
 The "Famous Fire" in McKeesport, Pennsylvania, destroys seven downtown structures, damages more than 12 others, and starts fires in at least 10 homes.
 May 24 
 Washington, D.C. Concorde service begins.
 The Judgment of Paris pits French vs. California wines in a blind taste-test in Paris, France. California wines win the contest, surprising the wine world and opening the wine industry to newcomers in several countries.
 May 25 – U.S. President Gerald Ford defeats challenger Ronald Reagan in three Republican presidential primaries: Kentucky, Tennessee and Oregon.
 May 30 – Indianapolis 500 automobile race: Johnny Rutherford wins the (rain-shortened) shortest race in event history to date, at 102 laps or 255 miles (408 km).

June
 June 2 – A car bomb kills Arizona Republic reporter Don Bolles.
 June 5 – The Teton Dam collapses in southeast Idaho, killing 11 people.
 June 13 – Savage thunderstorms roll through the state of Iowa spawning several tornadoes, including an F-5 tornado that destroys the town of Jordan, Iowa.
 June 16 – Francis E. Meloy, Jr., the newly appointed United States Ambassador to Lebanon, is assassinated in Beirut.
 June 17 – The National Basketball Association and the American Basketball Association agree on the ABA-NBA merger.
 June 20 – Hundreds of Western tourists are moved from Beirut and taken to safety in Syria by the U.S. military, following the murder of the U.S. ambassador to Lebanon.

July

 July 3 – Gregg v. Georgia: The Supreme Court of the United States rules that the death penalty is not inherently cruel or unusual and is a constitutionally acceptable form of punishment.
 July 4 
United States Bicentennial: From coast to coast, the United States celebrates the 200th anniversary of the Declaration of Independence.
The Puerto Rican Socialist Party leads 50,000 marchers in Philadelphia to demand a "Bicentennial Without Colonies" and independence for Puerto Rico.
 July 6 – The first class of women at the United States Naval Academy is inducted in Annapolis, Maryland.
 July 12
California State University, Fullerton massacre: seven people are shot and killed, and two others are wounded in a mass shooting on campus at California State University, Fullerton.
Barbara Jordan is the first African-American to keynote a political convention.
Price Club, as predecessor of Costco, a worldwide membership-registration-only retailer, is founded in California.
Family Feud debuts on ABC-TV.
 July 15
Jimmy Carter is nominated for U.S. President at the Democratic National Convention in New York City.
 Twenty-six Chowchilla schoolchildren and their bus driver are abducted and buried in a box truck within a quarry in Livermore, California. The captives dig themselves free after 16 hours. The quarry-owner's son and two accomplices are arrested for the crime.
 July 18 – Nadia Comaneci, at this time a 14-year-old Romanian, makes history by becoming the first gymnast to score a perfect 10 for her routine on the uneven bars at the Montreal Olympics.
 July 20
Viking program: The Viking 1 lander successfully lands on Mars, taking the first close-up color photos of the planet's surface.
Gary Gilmore is arrested for murdering two men in Utah.
 July 26 – In Los Angeles, Ronald Reagan announces his choice of liberal U.S. Senator Richard Schweiker as his vice presidential running mate, in an effort to woo moderate Republican delegates away from President Gerald Ford.
 July 27 – Delegates attending an American Legion convention at The Bellevue-Stratford Hotel in Philadelphia begin falling ill with a form of pneumonia: this will eventually be recognised as the first outbreak of Legionnaires' disease and will end in the deaths of 29 attendees.
 July 29 – In New York City, the "Son of Sam" pulls a gun from a paper bag, killing one and seriously wounding another, in the first of a series of attacks that terrorize the city for the next year.
 July 30 – Caitlyn Jenner (at this time, Bruce Jenner) wins the gold medal in the men's decathlon at the 1976 Summer Olympics in Montreal.
 July 31
NASA releases the famous Face on Mars photo, taken by Viking 1.
The Big Thompson River in northern Colorado floods, destroying more than 400 cars and houses.

August

 August 1 – The Seattle Seahawks and Tampa Bay Buccaneers play their first football games.
 August 2 – A gunman murders Andrea Wilborn and Stan Farr and injures Priscilla Davis and Gus Gavrel, in an incident at Priscilla's mansion in Fort Worth, Texas. T. Cullen Davis, Priscilla's estranged husband and one of the richest men in Texas, is tried and found not guilty in 1977.
 August 4 – The first recognized outbreak of Legionnaires' disease kills 29 at the American Legion convention in Philadelphia.
 August 7 – Viking program: Viking 2 enters into orbit around Mars.
 August 8 – As part of the American Basketball Association–National Basketball Association merger, a dispersal draft is conducted to assign teams for the players on the two ABA franchises which have folded.
 August 10—13 – Hurricane Belle hits Long Island and southern New England. Twelve people are killed by the storm and damage is $100 million.
 August 11 – A sniper rampage in Wichita, Kansas on a Holiday Inn results in 3 deaths while 7 others are wounded.
 August 18 – At Panmunjom, North Korea, two United States soldiers are killed while trying to chop down part of a tree in the Korean Demilitarized Zone which has obscured their view.
 August 19 – U.S. President Gerald Ford edges out challenger Ronald Reagan to win the Republican Party presidential nomination in Kansas City.
 August 28 – Actress Anissa Jones, known for playing the child Buffy Davis in the late 60s–early 70s sitcom Family Affair, is found dead of an accidental overdose in Oceanside, California.

September

 September 3 – Viking program: The Viking 2 spacecraft lands at Utopia Planitia on Mars.
 September 6 
Cold War: Soviet Air Force pilot Lt. Viktor Belenko lands a MiG-25 jet fighter at Hakodate, on the island of Hokkaidō in Japan, and requests political asylum from the United States.
Frank Sinatra brings Jerry Lewis's former partner Dean Martin onstage, unannounced, at the 1976 Jerry Lewis MDA Telethon in Las Vegas, Nevada, reuniting the comedy team for the first (and only) time in over 20 years.
 September 17 – The space shuttle Enterprise is rolled out of a Palmdale, California hangar.
 September 21 – Orlando Letelier is assassinated in Washington, D.C. by agents of Chilean dictator Augusto Pinochet.
 September 23 – The first presidential debate of the 1976 presidential election takes place.
 September 24 – Patty Hearst is sentenced to seven years in prison for her role in the armed robbery of a San Francisco bank in 1974 (an executive clemency order from U.S. President Jimmy Carter will set her free after only 22 months).
 September 28 – American singer Stevie Wonder releases his hit album Songs in the Key of Life.

October
 October 6 – In San Francisco, during his second televised debate with Jimmy Carter, U.S. President Gerald Ford stumbles when he declares that "there is no Soviet domination of Eastern Europe" (there is at the time).
 October 9 – Pittsburgh Pirates baseball pitcher Bob Moose is killed in a car crash in Ohio on his 29th birthday.
 October 13 – The United States Commission on Civil Rights releases the report Puerto Ricans in the Continental United States: An Uncertain Future, that documents that Puerto Ricans in the United States have a poverty rate of 33 percent in 1974 (up from 29 percent in 1970), the highest of all major racial-ethnic groups in the country (not including Puerto Rico, a U.S. territory).
 October 15 – The first ever vice presidential debate in the United States takes place between Bob Dole and Walter Mondale.
 October 18 – Ford officially launches volume production of Fiesta car at its Valencia plant.
 October 19 – The Copyright Act of 1976 extends copyright duration for an additional 20 years in the United States.
 October 20 – The Mississippi River ferry MV George Prince is struck by a ship while crossing from Destrehan, Louisiana to Luling, Louisiana, killing 78 passengers and crew.
 October 21 – The Cincinnati Reds sweep the New York Yankees in four games to win the 1976 World Series.
 October 22 – Barbara Walters hosts the final presidential debate of the 1976 presidential election.
 October 25 – Clarence Norris, the last known survivor of the Scottsboro Boys, is pardoned.

November

 November 2 – U.S. presidential election, 1976: Jimmy Carter defeats incumbent Gerald Ford, becoming the first candidate from the Deep South to win since the Civil War.
 November 4 – Mark Fidrych, pitcher for the Detroit Tigers, wins 1976 Major League Baseball Rookie Of The Year Award.
 November 15 – The first megamouth shark is discovered off Oahu in Hawaii.
 November 25 – In San Francisco, The Band holds its farewell concert, The Last Waltz.
 November 26 – Microsoft is officially registered with the Office of the Secretary of the State of New Mexico.
 November 29 – The New York Yankees sign free agent Reggie Jackson to a five-year $3 million contract, setting the precedent for lucrative multi-year contracts for Major League Baseball players in years to come.

December
 December 8 – The Congressional Hispanic Caucus is established by the five Latinos in the United States Congress: Herman Badillo of New York, E. de la Garza and Henry B. Gonzalez of Texas, Edward R. Roybal of California, and the nonvoting Resident Commissioner of Puerto Rico, Baltasar Corrada del Rio.
 December 20 – Richard J. Daley, Mayor of Chicago since 1955, dies while in office.

Undated
 California's sodomy law is repealed.
 The New Jersey State Legislature passes legislation legalizing casinos in the shore town of Atlantic City commencing in 1978. After signing the bill into law, Governor Brendan Byrne declares "The mob is not welcome in New Jersey!" referring to the Mafia's influence at casinos in Nevada.
 Thomas A. Minetree founds Bethesda Cancer Centers.
 The Early Academic Outreach Program (EAOP) is established by the University of California (UC) in response to the State Legislature's recommendation to expand post-secondary opportunities to all of California's students including those who are first-generation, socioeconomically disadvantaged, and English-language learners.
 Universe, a public domain film produced by Lester Novros for NASA, is released.
 Marc Brown's children's picture book Arthur's Nose is published.

Ongoing
 Cold War (1947–1991)
 Détente (c. 1969–1979)
 Capital punishment suspended by Furman v. Georgia (1972–1976)
 1970s energy crisis (1973–1980)

Births

January

 January 1 – Tank, R&B musician
 January 2
 Cletidus Hunt, football player
 Phil Radford, environmental, clean energy and democracy leader
 January 3 – Angela Yee, radio personality
 January 4 – Ted Lilly, baseball player
 January 5 – Jason Brookins, football player
 January 6
 Roberto Bergersen, basketball player
 Johnny Yong Bosch, actor, voice artist, martial artist and musician
 Danny Pintauro, actor
 January 8 
 Jenny Lewis, actress and singer for Rilo Kiley
 Josh Meyers, actor and comedian, brother of Seth Meyers
 Carl Pavano, baseball player
 January 10
 Adam Burke, comedian
 Adam Kennedy, baseball player
 January 11
 John Avery, football player
 Alfonso Boone, football player
 January 13 – Michael Peña, actor and musician
 January 15
 Meredith Bishop, actress
 Dorian Missick, actor
 January 16 – Carrie Keranen, voice actress
 January 20
 Wayne Bastrup, actor and musician
 Elisabeth Bennington, politician
 Michael Myers, football player
 January 21
 Chad Barnhardt, football player
 Zbigniew Bzymek, Polish-born filmmaker
 Mike Daisey, monologist, author, and actor
 January 22
 Jimmy Anderson, baseball player
 David Bazan, indie rock singer/songwriter and frontman for Pedro the Lion and Headphones
 James Dearth, football player
 January 23 – Nan Whaley, politician
 January 24 – Maria Gabriela Brito, Venezuelan-born curator, art advisor, and author
 January 25 – Stephanie Bellars, wrestling valet
 January 27
 Clint Ford, voice actor
 Fred Taylor, football player
 January 28 – Rick Ross, rapper
 January 29 – Chris Castle, singer/songwriter and guitarist
 January 30 – Andy Milonakis, internet and television personality
 January 31 
 Buddy Rice, race car driver
 Paul Scheer, actor and comedian

February

 February 2
 Ralph Biggs, American-born Belgian basketball player
 Lori Beth Denberg, actress and comedian
 February 3
 Mequitta Ahuja, painter
 Tim Heidecker, comedian
 February 4 – Cam'ron, rapper
 February 5
 Martin D. Burke, chemist
 Jaime Harrison, attorney and politician
 Brian Moorman, football player
 February 6
 Ksenia Anske, Russian-born author and novelist
 James Hiroyuki Liao, actor
 Kim Zmeskal, Olympic gymnast
 February 9
 Steve Burguiere, radio producer and personality
 Charlie Day, actor
 February 10
 Lance Berkman, baseball player and coach
 Gonzalo Lopez, fugitive, mass murderer, and prison escapee (d. 2022)
 February 11
 Tony Battie, basketball player
 Brice Beckham, actor
 Jason Miyares, politician
 February 12
 Anna Benson, model
 Jeff Brandes, politician
 February 14
 Big Smo, country rapper
 Erica Leerhsen, actress
 February 15
 Barbara Birley, American-born British archaeologist and curator
 Brandon Boyd, singer/songwriter and frontman for Incubus
 February 16
 Eric Byrnes, baseball player and analyst
 Janet Varney, actress and comedian
 February 17 – Scott Williamson, baseball player and coach
 February 20
 Steve Brown, yo-yo player
 Chris Cillizza, journalist
 February 21 – Frayser Boy, rapper
 February 22 – Kurt Braunohler, comedian
 February 23 – Scott Elarton, baseball player and coach
 February 24
 Crista Flanagan, actress and screenwriter
 Zach Johnson, golfer
 Matt Skiba, singer/songwriter, guitarist, and frontman for Alkaline Trio
 February 25
 Adrian Ballinger, British-born mountain climber and guide
 Rashida Jones, actress, writer, model, and musician
 February 26 – Dan Goldman, attorney and politician
 February 27
 Ryan Armour, golfer
 Tony Gonzalez, football player
 February 28
 Dave Brown, entrepreneur
 Ali Larter, actress and model
 February 29
 Ja Rule, rapper
 Shane Johnson, actor

March

 March 1
 Marte Alexander, American-born Italian basketball player
 Antron Brown, drag racer
 March 3
 Charlie Bethel, judge
 Bobby Brooks, football player
 Jill Tokuda, politician
 March 4
 Mack Bernard, Haitian-born politician
 Sean Covel, producer
 March 5 – 88-Keys, record producer and rapper
 March 6 – Ken Anderson, wrestler
 March 8 – Freddie Prinze Jr., actor
 March 9 – Jeremiah Bishop, mountain bike racer
 March 10 – Christa Pike, convicted murderer and the youngest woman to be sentenced to death
 March 11 – Doug Brzezinski, football player
 March 12
 Hisham Bharoocha, musician and visual artist
 Francesco Biancamano, football player
 March 13
 Marlon Barnes, football player
 Josh Bidwell, football player
 James Dewees, musician
 Danny Masterson, actor
 Jamie Pressnall, tap dancer and musician
 March 14
 Robert Baker, football player
 Brian Quinn, actor
 Merlin Santana, actor (d. 2002)
 Corey Stoll, actor
 March 15 – Katherine Brooks, writer and director
 March 16
 Nick Spano, actor
 Blu Cantrell, R&B singer
 March 17 – Brittany and Cynthia Daniel, actresses and twin sisters
 March 18
 Eugene Baker, football player
 Justin Bolli, golfer
 FanFan, American-born Taiwanese singer/songwriter
 Eric Sorensen, meteorologist and politician
 March 19
 Derek Chauvin, police officer who murdered George Floyd
 Andre Miller, basketball player
 De'aundre Bonds, actor
 March 20 – Chester Bennington, singer and frontman for Linkin Park (d. 2017)
 March 21
 Gabrielle Bell, British-born cartoonist
 Rachael MacFarlane, actress and singer, sister of Seth MacFarlane
 March 22
 Rahim Abdullah, football player
 Shawty Lo, rapper (d. 2016)
 Kathryn Jean Lopez, journalist
 Wayne Turner, basketball player
 Kellie Shanygne Williams, actress 
 Reese Witherspoon, actress, producer and entrepreneur
 March 23
 Jayson Blair, disgraced The New York Times reporter known for plagiarism and fabrication
 Michelle Monaghan, actress
 Jeremy Newberry, football player
 Keri Russell, actress
 March 24
 Aaron Brooks, football player
 Peyton Manning, football player
 March 25
 Somy Ali, Pakistani-born Bollywood actress, writer, filmmaker, model, and activist
 Corey Arnold, photographer
 Terry Babcock-Lumish, professor, entrepreneur, and policymaker
 Jim Bianco, musician, singer/songwriter, and producer
 Matt Burke, football coach
 Domenick Lombardozzi, actor
 March 26
 Blaise Alexander, automobile racing driver (d. 2001)
 Amy Smart, actress and fashion model
 March 27
 Michael Adams, politician
 Jeff Bates, businessman and co-founder of Slashdot
 Matt Bertani, ice hockey coach
 March 29
 Scott Atchison, baseball player
 Benjamin Bellas, artist
 Jennifer Capriati, tennis player
 March 30
 Jessica Cauffiel, actress and singer
 Ty Conklin, ice hockey player
 March 31 – Gabe Alberro, artist, writer, songwriter, and filmmaker

April

 April 1
 Troy Baker, actor and musician
 Jamaal Bowman, politician
 Evan Jones, actor
 David Oyelowo, English-born actor
 April 2 – Evan McMullin, CIA operations officer and political candidate
 April 4 – James Roday, actor, director, and screenwriter
 April 5
 Alias, hip-hop producer and founder of Anticon (d. 2018)
 Matt Blank, baseball player
 Sterling K. Brown, actor
 April 6
 Sean Berens, ice hockey player and coach
 Joseph Brent, musician
 Candace Cameron Bure, actress
 April 7
 Kevin Alejandro, director
 Eric Wareheim, comedian
 April 9
 Algebra, R&B singer
 Serena Auñón-Chancellor, astronaut
 Blayne Weaver, actor and filmmaker
 April 10
 Dann Battistone, tennis player
 Robert J. O'Neill, Navy SEAL, news contributor, author, and the individual who killed Osama bin Laden
 April 11 – Cory Brandan, singer and frontman for Norma Jean
 April 13
 John D. Anthony, politician
 Jonathan Brandis, actor (d. 2003)
 Glenn Howerton, actor
 April 14
 Mark Born, politician
 Jericho Brown, poet and writer
 Anna DeForge, basketball player
 April 15
 Jason Bonsignore, ice hockey player
 Brock Huard, football player
 April 16
 Phil Baroni, mixed martial artist and wrestler
 Lukas Haas, actor and musician
 Kelli O'Hara, actress and singer
 April 17 – Monet Mazur, actress
 April 18
 Adrian Alvarado, actor and writer
 Octavia Blue, basketball player
 Gavin Creel, actor and singer/songwriter
 Melissa Joan Hart, actress, producer and director
 Kevin Rankin, actor
 April 19
 Lionel Barnes, football player
 Wyatt Cenac, actor, writer, and director
 April 20 – Joey Lawrence, actor, musician, and game show host
 April 21
 Cecilia Ballí, journalist and anthropologist
 Darrius Blevins, football player
 April 22 – Mark Byington, basketball player and coach
 April 23 – Cesar Blanco, politician
 April 24
 John Barnes, baseball player
 George P. Bush, attorney and politician
 Mike Garcia, politician
 April 25 – Tim Duncan, basketball player
 April 27
 Chad Alban, ice hockey player
 Blaze Ya Dead Homie, rapper
 April 28 – Michael Carbonaro, actor, magician, and improv artist
 April 29 – Max Abramson, politician
 April 30 – Scott Savol, singer

May

 May 1
 Darius McCrary, actor
 James Murray, actor
 May 3
 D. J. Brigman, golfer
 Guillermo E. Brown, multi-disciplinary performer
 Jeff Halpern, ice hockey player
 May 4
 Michael Aronov, actor
 Jason Michaels, baseball player
 May 5 – Sage Stallone, actor, film director, producer, and distributor (d. 2012)
 May 6
 Alicka Ampry-Samuel, politician
 Marshall Burt, railroader and politician
 May 7
 Calvin Booth, basketball player
 Nick Butcher, field hockey player
 Michael P. Murphy, U.S. Navy SEAL, First recipient of the Medal of Honor in the Afghanistan War (d. 2005)
 May 8
 Gonçalo Abecasis, Portuguese-born biomedical researcher
 Luke Burbank, radio host and podcaster
 Martha Wainwright, Canadian-born folk-pop singer
 May 9 – Vanessa Alfano, journalist
 May 10 – Rhona Bennett, actress, singer, and model
 May 14
 Cortney Lance Bledsoe, writer, poet, and book reviewer
 Hunter Burgan, bassist for AFI
 May 15
 Michael Bishop, football player
 Torraye Braggs, basketball player
 Sashi Brown, football executive
 Ryan Leaf, football player
 Tyler Walker, baseball player
 May 16 – Pat Bradley, basketball player
 May 17 – Kandi Burruss, producer, television personality, singer/songwriter, and actress
 May 18 – Lisa Byington, announcer, studio host, producer, and reporter
 May 19
 Carrie Barton, Olympic synchronized swimmer
 Kevin Garnett, basketball player
 May 20 – Louis Bullock, basketball player
 May 21
 Rocky Biddle, baseball player
 Ryan Bittle, actor
 May 22 – Chris Brazzell, football player
 May 24 – Chris Bergson, guitarist and singer/songwriter
 May 25
 J. Michael Tatum, voice actor
 Erinn Hayes, actress
 Ethan Suplee, actor
 Vincent Piazza, actor 
 May 28 – Liam O'Brien, actor
 May 29
 Maceo Baston, basketball player
 Dawn Buth, tennis player
 May 30 – Brad Finstad, politician
 May 31 – Spencer Albee, singer/songwriter

June

 June 1 – Angela Perez Baraquio, Miss America 2001
 June 2
 Syl Apps III, ice hockey player
 Andre Barnett, entrepreneur, politician, and model
 Earl Boykins, basketball player
 June 3 – Jamie McMurray, race car driver
 June 5
 Aesop Rock, hip-hop artist
 Torry Holt, football player and sportscaster
 Joe Gatto, comedian
 June 6 – Paul Broome, soccer player
 June 7
 Sean Aaberg, comic artist
 Samantha Baggett, soccer player and coach
 Necro, rapper
 June 8
 Eion Bailey, actor
 Lindsay Davenport, tennis player
 June 9
 Kendra Horn, politician
 Leslie Rutledge, politician
 June 10 – Charles White, chef
 June 12 – Brian Anderson, skateboarder
 June 14
 Carmen Bricillo, football coach
 Ryan Brownlee, baseball player and coach
 June 16 – Tom Lenk, actor
 June 18
 Busbee, songwriter, record producer, publisher, record label executive, and multi-instrumentalist (d. 2019)
 Alana De La Garza, actress
 Christina Pazsitzky, Canadian-born comedian, podcaster, writer, host, and television personality
 Blake Shelton, country singer
 June 19
 Darnell Autry, football player
 Scott Avett, singer/songwriter, banjo player, guitarist and pianist
 Ryan Hurst, actor
 June 20 – Rob Mackowiak, baseball player and coach
 June 21
 Roxanne Avent, producer
 Mark Blasdel, politician
 Antonio Cochran, football player
 June 22 – Mike O'Brien, actor, writer, and comedian
 June 23
 Wade Barrett, soccer player
 Joe Becker, musician
 Aaron Ruell, director, photographer, and actor
 Brandon Stokley, football player
 June 24
 Rasheed Brokenborough, basketball player
 Jay Kristopher Huddy, artist, filmmaker and video game designer
 June 25
 Matthew Axelson, U.S. Navy SEAL and Navy Cross recipient (d. 2005)
 Neil Walker, Olympic swimmer
 June 27
 Leigh Nash, Christian singer/songwriter and vocalist for Sixpence None the Richer
 Joseph Sikora, actor
 June 28
 Tony Ray Amati, convicted serial killer
 Jason J. Lewis, voice actor
 Seth Wescott, Olympic snowboarder
 June 29 – Omar Doom, actor, musician, and artist
 June 30
 Angie Akers, volleyball player
 Jason Bostic, football player

July

 July 1
 Thomas Sadoski, actor
 Haaz Sleiman, Lebanese-born actor
 July 2
 Erin Burnett, news anchor
 Tommy Pistol, actor and director
 July 3 – Andrea Barber, actress
 July 4
 Layne Beaubien, Olympic water polo player
 Jo Chen, Taiwanese-born comic book artist and writer
 July 5
 Bizarre, rapper
 Jamie Elman, Canadian-born actor
 Rufus Johnson, rapper
 July 7
 Cyndi Buchheit-Courtway, politician
 Hamish Linklater, actor and playwright
 July 9
 Krondon, rapper and actor
 Fred Savage, actor and director
 July 10
 Elijah Blue Allman, singer, guitarist, and frontman for Deadsy
 JoJuan Armour, football player
 Adrian Grenier, actor, musician, and director
 Elissa Slotkin, politician
 July 12
 Kris Bergstrom, taiko player
 Gwenda Bond, author
 Kyrsten Sinema, politician
 Tracie Spencer, R&B singer
 July 15
 Gabriel Iglesias, comedian, actor and producer
 Jim Jones, rapper, member of hip hop group The Diplomats
 July 16
 Bobby Lashley, wrestler
 Zak Smith, artist and adult film performer
 July 17 –
 Luke Bryan, country singer/songwriter
 Colby Buzzell, author, blogger, and U.S. Amry soldier
 Dagmara Domińczyk, Polish-born actress and author
 Eric Winter, actor and fashion model
 July 18 – Sebastian Blanck, musician and figurative painter
 July 21 – Cori Bush, politician and Black Lives Matter activist
 July 22 – Nino Alejandro, Philippine-born singer/songwriter
 July 23
 Charla Baklayan Faddoul, Syrian-born television personality
 Tony Bevilacqua, guitarist for The Distillers
 Matt Birk, football player
 Anthony Blevins, football player
 Stephanie Grisham, White House Press Secretary (2019-2020)
 July 24
 Chris Ahrens, Olympic rower
 Rafer Alston, basketball player
 Nate Bump, baseball player
 Rashida Tlaib, politician
 July 26 – Martha Roby, politician
 July 27
 Ryan Michelle Bathe, actress
 Brandon Beane, football executive
 July 28 – Jacoby Shaddix, singer, television personality, and frontman for Papa Roach
 July 29
 Abiola Abrams, author, podcaster, motivational speaker, and spiritual life coach
 Peter Alexander, journalist
 July 30 – Nigel Burton, football player, coach, and commentator
 July 31
 Marty Booker, football player
 Rod Monroe, football player (d. 2017)

August

 August 1
 Robin Belcher, politician
 Don Hertzfeldt, animator
 August 3 – Scott Barry, MLB umpire
 August 4 – Paul Goldstein, tennis player
 August 5 – Napoleon Beazley, convicted murderer (d. 2002)
 August 6
 Roderick Blakney, American-born Bulgarian basketball player
 Soleil Moon Frye, actress and producer
 Travis Kalanick, businessman and computer programmer; co-founder of Uber
 August 7
 Nargiz Birk-Petersen, Azerbaijani-born lawyer, presenter, and model
 Regina T. Boyce, politician
 August 8
 JC Chasez, singer and member of 'N Sync
 Drew Lachey, singer and member of 98 Degrees
 Nigél Thatch, actor
 August 9 – Jessica Capshaw, actress
 August 10 – Zach Azzanni, football coach
 August 11
 Jermaine Alfred, football player
 Brendan Bayliss, singer, guitarist, and frontman for Umphrey's McGee
 Will Friedle, actor, voice actor, writer, and comedian
 August 12
 Antoine Walker, basketball player
 Wednesday 13, rock musician
 August 14 – Alex Albrecht, television personality
 August 16 – Terence Crutcher, African-American killed by police (d. 2016)
 August 17
 Matt Anderson, baseball player
 Scott Halberstadt, actor
 August 18
 Teri Anulewicz, politician
 Brian Bowles, baseball player
 Jon Busch, soccer player and coach
 Bryan Volpenhein, Olympic rower
 August 19 – Michael M. Wartella, underground cartoonist
 August 21
 Sam Beall, chef and restauranteur (d. 2016)
 Charles Berkeley, Olympic bobsledder
 Alex Brooks, ice hockey player
 August 23
 Michael Bhatia, researcher on conflict resolution in war-torn countries (d. 2008)
 Scott Caan, actor
 August 25
 Jensen Atwood, actor
 Damon Jones, basketball player and coach
 August 26 – Mike Colter, actor
 August 27 – Jeremy Bates, football player
 August 30 – Lillo Brancato, Jr., actor

September

 September 1
 Babydaddy, bassist, vocalist, and guitarist for Scissor Sisters
 Cornelius Bonner, football player
 Larry Brown, football player
 September 3
 Tony Bryant, football player
 Jevon Kearse, football player
 September 4 – Brian Myrow, baseball player
 September 5 – Chris Broach, guitarists/vocalists for Braid
 September 6
 Mike Amiri, fashion designer
 Annet Artani, singer/songwriter
 Brendon Ayanbadejo, football player
 Mark Wilkerson, musician
 September 7 – Stevie Case, video game celebrity
 September 9 – Jack Brasington, tennis player
 September 11
 Masih Alinejad, Iranian-born journalist and women's rights activist
 Leilani Bishop, model
 September 12
 Amanda Adams, author, archaeologist, and fashion model
 Bizzy Bone, rapper
 LaVell Boyd, football player
 September 13 – Ro Khanna, politician
 September 14
 Vlatko Andonovski, Yugoslavian-born soccer player and coach
 Austin Basis, actor
 September 15
 Bacari Alexander, basketball player and coach
 Nanette Barragán, politician
 Rob Wiethoff, actor
 September 16
 Erik Aadahl, sound editor
 Greg Buckner, basketball player
 September 17
 Samuel Aroutiounian, producer and entrepreneur
 Nicole Reinhart, cyclist (d. 2000)
 September 18
 Jeremy Barnes, musician
 Reggie Berg, ice hockey player
 Angie Braziel, basketball player
 Sophina Brown, actress
 September 19
 Raja Bell, basketball player
 Jay Electronica, rapper and producer
 Alison Sweeney, actress and television host
 September 20
 Jaymi Bailey, soccer player
 Jon Bernthal, actor
 Brandon Burlsworth, football player (d. 1999)
 September 22 – David Berkeley, singer/songwriter
 September 24
 Phil Bartlett, politician
 Radha Blank, actress, filmmaker, playwright, rapper, and comedian
 Ian Bohen, actor
 Ben Broussard, baseball player
 Erin Houchin, politician
 Stephanie McMahon-Levesque, wrestling promoter, daughter of Vince McMahon
 September 25
 Charlotte Ayanna, actress and beauty pageant titleholder
 Chauncey Billups, basketball player
 Doug Bohaboy, tennis player
 September 28 – Farah Alvin, actress
 September 29 – Dave Aranda, football coach
 September 30 – Dusty Johnson, politician

October

 October 1 – Danielle Bisutti, actress and singer
 October 2
 Eric Burlison, politician
 Mandisa, gospel singer and American Idol contestant
 October 3
 Candy Apples, pornographic actress
 Seann William Scott, actor and producer
 October 4 – Alicia Silverstone, actress
 October 5 – Matt Hamill, mixed martial artist
 October 7 – Taylor Hicks, singer and American Idol winner
 October 8
 Kelly Armstrong, politician
 Blockhead, hip-hop record producer and DJ
 Peter Stickles, actor
 October 9
 William Alexander, writer and academic
 Sam Riegel, voice actor and director
 Nick Swardson, actor, stand-up comedian, and screenwriter
 October 10
 Bob Burnquist, Brazilian-born skateboarder
 Pat Burrell, baseball player
 October 11
 Emily Deschanel, actress
 Dave Briggs, journalist
 October 12
 Ian Bell, media executive and CEO of Digital Trends
 Tom Burke, football player
 October 14 – Scott Bradley, racing driver
 October 15
 Jacob Bannon, singer and frontman for Converge
 Michelle Beisner-Buck, NFL cheerleader and reporter
 October 19
 Jeff Austin, baseball player
 Diego Bernal, politician
 Omar Gooding, actor
 Desmond Harrington, actor
 Pete Loeffler, singer, guitarist, and frontman for Chevelle
 Michael Young, baseball player
 October 20
 Reidel Anthony, football player
 Scott Blake, artist
 Anna Boden, filmmaker
 Dan Fogler, actor, comedian, and writer
 October 21
 Jaime Andrews, actress, producer, business director, and playwright
 Albrey Battle, football player
 Jeremy Miller, actor
 October 22
 Michael Barrett, baseball player
 Brent Bartholomew, football player
 Jon Foreman, singer/songwriter, guitarist, and frontman for Switchfoot
 October 23 – Trevor Engelson, producer
 October 24
 Amy Allen, actress
 Arturo Del Puerto, actor
 October 25
 Michelle Biloon, comedian
 Kristin Rossum, toxicologist and convicted murderer
 October 26 – Thurop Van Orman, animator and voice actor
 October 29
 Marcus Amaker, poet
 Glenn Berggoetz, director, writer, and actor
 Milena Govich, actress, director, singer, dancer, and musician
 October 31
 Seth Abramson, professor, attorney, author, political columnist, and poet
 Piper Perabo, actress

November

 November 1
 Aazaar Abdul-Rahim, football player and coach
 Adah Almutairi, scientist and professor
 John Bevan, figure skater
 Chad Lindberg, actor
 Sam Presti, basketball executive, general manager of the NBA's Oklahoma City Thunder since 2007
 November 5
 Sebastian Arcelus, actor
 Jeff Klein, singer-songwriter and guitarist 
 Samuel Page, actor
 Ben Quayle, lawyer and politician
 November 6
 Laurie Baker, ice hockey player
 Chris Bell, football player
 Jeremy Borseth, football player
 Jace Bugg, golfer (d. 2003)
 Rob Buyea, author
 Troy Hambrick, football player
 Mike Herrera, singer/songwriter, bassist, and frontman for MxPx and Tumbledown
 Pat Tillman, football player, victim of friendly fire (d. 2004)
 Sal Vulcano, actor
 Wiley Wiggins, actor
 November 7
 Paul Boyd, Canadian-born journalist
 Rob Caggiano, guitarist for Volbeat
 November 9
 Jamal Brooks, football player
 Josh Kaufman, singer/songwriter, winner of The Voice (Season 6)
 November 11
 Allister Adel, attorney and politician (d. 2022)
 Corey Atkins, football player
 November 12
 Matt Bowen, football player
 Tevin Campbell, singer and actor
 November 14
 Tyson Ballou, model
 Tiffiny Blacknell, lawyer
 November 15
 Malar Balasubramanian, pediatrician convicted of involuntary manslaughter (d. 2017)
 Brian Banks, politician
 November 16 – Trevor Brazile, rodeo competitor
 November 17 – Diane Neal, actress
 November 18
 Jessi Alexander, country singer/songwriter
 Dominic Armato, voice actor, journalist, and food critic
 November 19
 Happy Anderson, actor
 Eric Bostrom, motorcycle racer
 Jesse Brinkley, boxer
 Jack Dorsey, computer programmer and Internet entrepreneur, co-founder of Twitter
 November 20 – Dominique Dawes, Olympic gymnast
 November 21 – Yoon Ahn, fashion designer
 November 22
 Oliver Ackermann, rock musician and founder of Death by Audio
 Kate Barber, field hockey player
 November 23 – Page Kennedy, actor and rapper
 November 24
 Matt Brown, parathlete
 Jorge Elorza, politician, mayor of Providence, Rhode Island
 November 25
 Aziza Baccouche, physicist and science filmmaker (d. 2021)
 Donovan McNabb, football player
 November 26
 Keith Beach, soccer player
 Maia Campbell, actress and singer
 November 27 – Jaleel White, actor
 November 28 – Adam Bernero, baseball player
 November 29
 Chris Akins, football player
 Ricardo Almeida, mixed martial artist
 Lindsay Benko, Olympic swimmer
 Chadwick Boseman, actor and playwright (d. 2020)
 Anna Faris, actress
 Ehren McGhehey, stunt performer and actor
 November 30 – Shawn Bryson, football player

December

 December 1 
 Matthew Shepard, murder victim (d. 1998)
 Laura Ling, journalist, imprisoned by North Korea in 2009
 December 2 – Jamie Barnette, football player
 December 3 – Cornelius Griffin, football player
 December 4
 Amie Comeaux, country music singer (d. 1997)
 Greg Landsman, politician
 December 5
 Amy Acker, actress
 Amanda Adkins, Olympic swimmer
 C-Note, rapper
 December 6 – Séverine Autesserre, French-born author and researcher
 December 7
 Mark Duplass, actor, screenwriter, and director
 T.J. Lavin, BMX cyclist and television host
 December 8 – Ryan Blackwell, basketball player and coach
 December 9
 Phil Armour, football player
 Chris Booker, baseball player
 Jimmy Brumbaugh, football player
 December 10 – Tim Ashe, politician
 December 11 – Shareef Abdur-Rahim, basketball player and president of the NBA G League since 2019
 December 12 – Eric M. Bromwell, politician
 December 14
 Tammy Blanchard, actress
 Leland Chapman, bail bondsman
 December 16 – Ryan Aument, politician
 December 17
 Dan Hageman, screenwriter and television producer
 Tracey Mann, politician
 Takeo Spikes, football player
 December 19 – Beau Archibald, basketball player and coach
 December 20
 Michael Binger, poker player
 David Bronson, singer/songwriter
 Aubrey Huff, baseball player and radio host
 December 21
 Christie Ambrosi, softball player
 Lamont Bagby, politician
 Andy Gipson, politician
 December 23
 Raheem Beyah, computer engineer, researcher, and educator
 Kris Brown, football player
 Jamie Noble, wrestler
 December 24
 Shalanda Baker, Director of the Office of Economic Impact and Diversity at the US Department of Energy (2022-present)
 Chris Bober, football player
 December 27 – Tim Arson, wrestler (d. 2015)
 December 28 – Joe Manganiello, actor
 December 29
 Thomas Blake, tennis player
 Danny McBride, actor, comedian, and writer
 December 31
 Christopher B. Anderson, ecologist
 Vanessa Kerry, physician and health care administrator
 Chris Terrio, film director/screenwriter

Full Date Unknown

 Kulsoom Abdullah, American-born Pakistani weightlifter
 Hassan Abujihaad, U.S. Navy sailor convicted of terrorism
 John Joseph Adams, science fiction and fantasy editor, critic, and publisher
 Adunni Ade, American-born Nigerian actress and model
 Golnar Adili, artist
 Farooque Ahmed, convicted terrorist
 Marc Alessi, politician
 Kimberly Amato, actress and author
 Ana Lily Amirpour, British-born director, screenwriter, producer, and actress
 Ampichino, rapper and producer
 Ning An, Chinese-born pianist
 Angelina, singer
 Sarah Aroeste, singer and composer
 Huwaida Arraf, activist and lawyer
 Elena Bajo, Spanish-born visual artist
 Mishell Baker, writer
 Benjamin Balint, author, journalist, educator, and translator
 Simon Ball, ballet dancer
 Ali Banisadr, Iranian-born artist
 Mahmoud Reza Banki, Iranian-born scientist
 Michael Baskette, music producer
 Orca Bates, model
 Matt Bauder, jazz musician
 Naomi Beckwith, art curator
 T. James Belich, playwright and actor
 Frank Benson, artist
 Ashley Berggren, basketball player
 Mickey Bergman, Vice President and executive director of the Richardson Center for Global Engagement
 Josh Berk, author
 Leah Berman, mathematician
 Walead Beshty, British-born artist and writer
 Jamila Bey, journalist
 Jay Black, comedian
 Libby Black, artist
 Brad Boatright, musician, record producer, and mastering engineer
 Anthony Boone, basketball player
 Jeff Bourne, politician
 James Brand, musician (d. 2010)
 Jennie E. Brand, sociologist and social statistician
 Jesse Brand, songwriter, musician, and actor
 Ivan Brandon, comic book writer
 Ryan Brasseaux, folklorist
 Joey Brinson, wheelchair fencer
 Sara Bronfman, daughter of Edgar Bronfman Sr., and member of NXIVM
 Amanda Browder, installation artist
 Josh Brown, singer and frontman for Day of Fire
 John Bunn, wrongfully convicted man
 Victoria Burge, artist
 Dillon Burroughs, author
 Shaun Butler, BMX rider
 Kent Bye, podcaster and journalist
 Vasili Byros, musicologist
 Brandon DiCamillo, television personality, actor, stunt performer, filmmaker, and musician

Deaths

 January 15 – Jim Graner, sports anchor (born 1919)
 January 21 – John Gould Moyer, naval officer, 31st Governor of American Samoa (born 1893)
 January 23 – Paul Robeson, bass baritone (born 1898)
 January 31 – Ernesto Miranda, defendant in Miranda v. Arizona (born 1941)
 February 1
 Leland H. Jenks, economic historian (born 1892)
 George Whipple, scientist, recipient of the Nobel Prize in Physiology or Medicine (born 1878)
 February 11 
 Lee J. Cobb, actor (born 1911)
 John H. Hester, general (born 1886)
 February 12 – Sal Mineo, film actor (born 1939)
 February 13 – Lily Pons, operatic soprano (born 1898 in France)
 February 22 – Florence Ballard, singer (The Supremes) (born 1943)
 February 26 – Joseph Weil, con man (born 1875)
 March 15 – Jo Mielziner, set and lighting designer (born 1901 in France)
 March 17 – Andrew Tombes, comedian and character actor (born 1885)
 March 25 – Josef Albers, Modernist painter (born 1888 in Germany)
 April 4 – Harry Nyquist, information theory pioneer (born 1889 in Sweden)
 April 5 – Howard Hughes, aviation pioneer, film director and millionaire recluse  (born 1905)
 April 9 – Phil Ochs, protest singer-songwriter (born 1940)
 April 14 – William H. Hastie, judge and politician  (born 1904)
 June 6 – J. Paul Getty, industrialist (born 1892)
 June 20 – Lou Klein, baseball player and coach (born 1918)
 August 26 – Lotte Lehmann, soprano (born 1888 in Germany)
 August 28 – Anissa Jones, TV actress (born 1958) 
 September 10 – Dalton Trumbo, screenwriter and novelist (born 1905)
 October 9 – Bob Moose, baseball player (born 1947)
 October 15 – Carlo Gambino, mafioso (born 1902 in Italy)
 November 11 – Alexander Calder, sculptor (born 1898)
 November 28 – Rosalind Russell, film actress (born 1907)
 December 2 – Danny Murtaugh, baseball player and manager (born 1917)
 December 12 – Jack Cassidy, actor and singer (born 1927)
 December 20 – Richard J. Daley, Mayor of Chicago (born 1902)

See also 
 1976 in American television
 List of American films of 1976
 Timeline of United States history (1970–1989)

References

External links
 
 

 
1970s in the United States
United States
United States
Years of the 20th century in the United States